Ochwalkee Creek is a stream in Georgia, United States. It is a tributary to the Oconee River. The name 'Ochwalkee' is derived from the Creek language meaning 'dirty water'.

References

Rivers of Georgia (U.S. state)
Rivers of Laurens County, Georgia
Rivers of Wheeler County, Georgia